In probability and business statistics, the Bates distribution, named after Grace Bates, is a probability distribution of the mean of a number of statistically independent  uniformly distributed random variables on the unit interval. This distribution is related to the uniform, the triangular, and the normal Gaussian distribution, and has applications in broadcast engineering for signal enhancement. The Bates distribution is sometimes confused with the Irwin–Hall distribution, which is the distribution of the sum (not the mean) of n independent random variables uniformly distributed from 0 to 1. Thus, the two distributions are simply versions of each other as they only differ in scale.

Definition
The Bates distribution is the continuous probability distribution of the mean, X, of n independent, uniformly distributed, random variables on the unit interval, Uk:

The equation defining the probability density function of a Bates distribution random variable X is

 

for x in the interval (0,1), and zero elsewhere. Here sgn(nx − k) denotes the sign function:

More generally, the mean of n independent uniformly distributed random variables on the interval [a,b]

would have the probability density function (PDF) of

Extensions and Applications

With a few modifications, the Bates distribution encompasses the uniform, the triangular and, taking the limit as n goes to infinity, also the normal Gaussian distribution. 

Replacing the term  when calculating the mean, X, with  will create a similar distribution with a constant variance, such as unity. Then, by subtracting the mean, the resulting mean of the distribution will be set at zero. Thus the parameter n would become a purely shape-adjusting parameter. By also allowing n to be a non-integer, a highly flexible distribution can be created, for example, U(0,1) + 0.5U(0,1) gives a trapezoidal distribution.

The Student-t distribution provides a natural extension of the normal Gaussian distribution for modeling of long tail data. A Bates distribution that has been generalized as previously stated fulfills the same purpose for short tail data.

The Bates distribution has an application to beamforming and pattern synthesis in the field of electrical engineering. The distribution was found to increase the beamwidth of the main lobe, representing an increase in the signal of the radiation pattern in a single direction, while simultaneously reducing the, usually undesirable, sidelobe levels.

See also 
 Irwin–Hall distribution
 Normal distribution
 Central limit theorem
 Uniform distribution (continuous)
 Triangular distribution

References

Further reading
Bates,G.E. (1955) "Joint distributions of time intervals for the occurrence of successive accidents in a generalized Polya urn scheme", Annals of Mathematical Statistics, 26, 705–720
 

Continuous distributions